Akkitham Achuthan Namboothiri (18 March 1926 – 15 October 2020), popularly known as Akkitham, was an Indian poet and essayist who wrote in Malayalam. He was known for a simple and lucid style of writing, exploring themes of profound love and compassion in his works. Some of his prominent works included Irupatham Noottandinte Ithihasam (English: Epic of the 20th century),  Balidarshanam (English: The vision of Bali), and Nimisha Kshetram (English: Holy moment).

Akkitham was the recipient of India's highest literary honour, the Jnanpith Award in 2019, and other awards including Padma Shri, Ezhuthachan Award, Kendra Sahitya Akademi Award, Kerala Sahitya Akademi Award for Poetry, Odakkuzhal Award, Vallathol Award, Vayalar Award, Aasan Prize and O. N. V. Literary Award. He died on 15 October 2020, aged 94, in Thrissur.

Early life 
Akkitham Achuthan Namboothiri was born on 18 March 1926 at Amettikkara, near Kumaranellur in Palakkad district of the south Indian state of Kerala to Amettu Akkithathu Manayil Vasudevan Namboothiri and Checkur Manaykkal Parvathy Antharjanam. After schooling in Sanskrit, Astrology and Music, he started his college education but did not complete his graduate degree course. He is the first prisedent of Thapasya(group of artists and literary fellows)a organization under RSS

Literary career 

Akkitham started his career as an editor of Unni Namboothiri magazine, which he used as a platform for his social activities. He also worked as an assistant editor at Mangalodayam and Yogakshemam magazines. In 1956, he joined the Kozhikode station of the All India Radio (AIR) where he served until 1975 after which he was transferred to the Thrissur station of the AIR. He was also associated with Anaadi, a literary initiative for popularising studies of Vedas.

His literary works began to gain wide attention in the early 1950s and Irupatham Noottandinte Ithihasam (English: "Epic of the 20th Century"), a khandakavya is one of the first truly modernist poems in Malayalam literature, the book also won the Sanjayan Award in 1952. He published approximately 45 books comprising poetry anthologies, plays and short stories. Balidarsanam (English: "The Vision of Bali"), Arangettam, Nimisha Kshetram, Idinju Polinja Lokam, Amritaghatika, and Kalikkottilil are some of his notable poetry anthologies. Upanayanam and Samavarttanam, two collections of essays, feature among the writings in prose. Sree Mahabhagavatham, his translation of Srimad Bhagavatam, composed of 14,613 verses, covers over 2,400 pages. Some of the themes that Akkitham explored in his works included love and compassion. He is acknowledged to have introduced "meaningful modernism" as a central theme in his poetry.

Akkitham was involved in social reform activities and through his association with Yogakshema Sabha, he strived to bring in reforms in the lives of the Namboothiri Brahmins of Kerala. He was associated with various centres in Thirunavaya, Kadavallur and Thrissur, for the promotion of vedic studies. He was also associated with the Paliyam Satyagraha, a peaceful protest against untouchability in 1947.

Awards and honours 
Akkitham received the Sanjayan Award in 1952, for his work, Irupatham Noottandinte Ithihasam and the Kerala Sahitya Akademi Award for Poetry in 1971 for Balidarshanam. He received two major honours in 1973, the Sahitya Akademi Award for Balidarshanam and the Odakkuzhal Award for Nimisha Kshetram. He was selected for the Asan Smaraka Kavitha Puraskaram in 1994 and, two years later, for the 1996 Lalithambika Antharjanam Smaraka Sahitya Award, followed by the Vallathol Award in 1997.

The next major honour for Akkitham came by way of Vayalar Award which he received in 2012. The Government of Kerala awarded him Ezhuthachan Puraskaram, their highest literary award in 2016. He received Padma Shri, the fourth highest civilian award of the Government of India in 2017. He could not attend the investiture ceremony due to ill health and the award was later handed over to him by the district collector of Palakkad. In 2019 he received the O. N. V. Literary Award. He received the Jnanpith Award, the highest Indian literary award, in 2019. Reflecting on his lifetime contribution to Malayalam literature, the Jnanpith Award citation specifically noted him as "A poet of rare integrity" and noted that his poetry reflected "unfathomable compassion, imprints of Indian philosophical and moral values and a bridge between tradition and modernity, and delved deep into human emotions in a fast changing social space."

He was also a recipient of several other honours such as Krishna Geedhi Award, Nalappad Award(2012), Puthezhan Award, Deviprasadam Trust Award (2000), Moorti Devi Award of Bharatiya Jnanpith and Amrita Keerti Puraskar (2004). Arikil Akkitham is a documentary film directed by E. Suresh, which details the life of the poet from the perspective of his daughter, Sreeja.

Personal life 
Akkitham was married to Sreedevi Antharjanam and the couple had two sons, Narayanan and Vasudevan, and four daughters Sreeja, Indira, Parvathy and Leela. The family lives in Amettikkara. Antharjanam, died on 13 March 2019, at the age of 85. Noted painter Akkitham Narayanan is his younger brother.

Akkitham died on 15 October 2020, at the age of 94 in West Fort Hi-Tech Hospital in Thrissur. His funeral took place with full state honours at his home in Kumaranellur, on the same day.

Bibliography

Poetry

Poetry translated into foreign languages 
 Selected Poems of Akkitham: From God's Own country, translated into English by P.K.N. Panicker, New Delhi, Authors Press, 2018.
 The Berry in the Palm (Karatalamalakam), translated into English by Rizio Yohannan Raj, in: The Oxford India Anthology of Modern Malayalam Literature, vol. 1 (Poetry, Drama, Prose), New Delhi, Oxford University Press, 2017, pp. 89–93.

Essays and literary criticisms

Children's literature

Translations

Others

References

External links

 
 
 
 K.M.Seethi (2020): "Akkitham: An Exemplar of humanist-aesthetic," Global South Colloquy,

1926 births
2020 deaths
20th-century Indian male writers
20th-century Indian poets
Indian male poets
Malayalam-language writers
Malayalam poets
People from Palakkad district
Poets from Kerala
Recipients of the Ezhuthachan Award
Recipients of the Jnanpith Award
Recipients of the Kerala Sahitya Akademi Award
Recipients of the Padma Shri in literature & education
Recipients of the Sahitya Akademi Award in Malayalam
Recipients of the Moortidevi Award